The 149th Pennsylvania House of Representatives District is located in Montgomery County and includes the following areas:

 Bridgeport
 Lower Merion Township (PART)
 Ward 05
 Ward 06 
 Ward 07
 Ward 10 [PART, Divisions 01 and 02]
 Ward 11 
 Ward 14 
 Upper Merion Township 
 West Conshohocken
 West Norriton Township (PART)
 District 02 [PART, Division 02]
 District 04

Representatives

References

Government of Montgomery County, Pennsylvania
149